Marmorana serpentina is a species of air-breathing land snail, a terrestrial pulmonate gastropod mollusk in the family Helicidae. 

Subspecies
 Marmorana serpentina carae (Cantraine, 1840)
 Marmorana serpentina circeja (Kobelt, 1903)
 Marmorana serpentina hospitans (Rossmässler, 1836)
 Marmorana serpentina isarae (Paulucci, 1882)
 Marmorana serpentina isilensis (L. Pfeiffer, 1848)
 Marmorana serpentina jaspidaea (Moquin-Tandon, 1855)
 Marmorana serpentina serpentina (A. Férussac, 1821)

Distribution
This species of snail occurs in the area of Alghero, in western Sardinia; also in Corsica.

Anatomy
This snail creates and uses love darts as part of its mating behavior.

References

 Benoit, C. L. (1857-1862). Illustrazione sistematica critica iconografica de'testacei estramarini della Sicilia ulteriore e delle isole circostanti. I-XVI, 1-248, Tav. I-IX, XI-XII [Part 1 pp. I-XVI, 1-52 (1857 [sic]); Part 2 pp. 53-116 (1857); Part 3 pp. 117-180 (1859); Part 4 pp. 181-248 (1862)]. Napoli. (Nobile).
 Bank, R. A.; Neubert, E. (2017). Checklist of the land and freshwater Gastropoda of Europe. Last update: July 16th, 2017

External links
 Marmorana serpentina at AnimalBase
 Images of live animal and shells
 Crosse H. & Debeaux O. (1869). Description de deux Hélices nouvelles de Corse. Journal de Conchyliologie. 17(1): 51-55

Helicidae
Gastropods described in 1821